Pedestrian and bicycle bridge over Saint Volodymyr Descent, also known as Klitschko Glass Bridge, is a bridge connecting two parks in Kyiv, the Saint Volodymyr Hill and Khreshchatyi Park over the street Saint Volodymyr Descent. It is used by pedal cycles and pedestrians only. Built over five months at a cost of 275 million hryvnia, the bridge was opened by Kyiv mayor Vitali Klitschko on 25 May 2019.

History

Background
The original idea of the bridge between two parks belongs to a Ukrainian architect Vasyl Krychevsky. The bridge was supposed to be a part of Kyiv Government Center project made for architecture contest that was held in 1934, when Kyiv regained its status as the Ukrainian capital. Krychevsky designed the traffic viaduct that was planned to connect the Central Committee of the Communist Party and the Council of People's Commissars. He was praised for the viaduct project, but his variant of Government Center was dismissed.

In the independent Ukraine, the plan of building the bridge was brought back up in 2006. At the meeting of Kyiv Architecture Department on September 6 Heorhii Dukhovnychyi presented the project of a shopping mall with offices and apartments at Volodymyrskyi Descent. The building featured a bridge over the descent, making it similar to Kyiv's central shopping mall Globus that was built in 2002 and had a similar bridge connecting its roof with a park. The project was approved for further development, but it had never ended up anything more than a concept.

In 2013, Kyiv City State Administration decided that there had to be a bridge between two parks, and it had to be opened in 2014. The contest where Kyiv citizens had to choose the best project took place in May. The contest was international and featured participants from different countries: ipv Delft from Netherlands, Buro Happold from United Kingdom, Asadov Architectural Studio from Russia, Leuppi & Schafroth Architekten from Switzerland, RR Architectes from Spain and two projects from Ukraine, one from Soyuzdorproekt and one from Kyivdormostproekt. However, the contest failed because of the split of opinion – the citizens chose a project from Netherlands while the contest judges couldn't decide between Spain and Switzerland.

Final project
The order to build a new pedestrian and bicycle bridge was issued by Kyiv City State Administration in February of 2017, the project's architect had to be decided in a contest. In October 2018, Proektni Systemy LTD was chosen as a winner with a project of Andrii Myrhorodskyi, it featured a 210 meters long steel bridge with glass elements. In November, SpetsAvtoBud had won the tender to build the footbridge, S420 stainless steel for the construction was fabricated in Azovstal.

The land preparation began in December 2018. The construction of piers was started in February 2019, the descent was temporarily narrowed with fence to place the cranes. The installation of spans began in March, the final one was installed in April, Klitschko posted a video in Facebook where, following the tradition, the champagne bottle was placed between two spans to be broken during the locking. In May, the installation of glass panels began as well as repair of park space near the bridge that was cleared up for the construction.

Criticism

UNESCO buffer zone concerns
When the bridge was under construction, Ukrainian Ministry of Culture sent a letter to Kyiv City State Administration to ask for canceling the project because of Volodymyr hills being an object of UNESCO Word Heritage. The administration refused to stop the construction stating that its location is outside of the Sofia Cathedral's buffer zone which makes it completely legal. In March 2019, Mayor of Kyiv Vitali Klitschko alongside director of Historical Heritage Olena Serdiuk had visited the UNESCO headquarters in Paris to present the project of Kyiv's tourist route and to prove the legality of the new bridge. UNESCO's consulting mission decided to visit Kyiv in April.

Plagiarism accusations
In May 2019, Swiss architect Stefanie M. Schafroth, the co-founder of Leuppi & Schafroth Architekten, stated that Andrii Myrhorodskyi from Proektni Systemy LTD stole their project of the bridge that had won the contest back in 2013 for which they still didn't get their prize money promised by Kyiv. She also added that the cost of Swiss project was $6 million while the Ukrainian one increased it to $10 million. Andrii Myrhorodskyi called Stefanie's accusations 'complete nonsense' because his company was working on the footbridge project since 2010, making the plagiarism impossible in this situation. Andrii was supported by the transport infrastructure expert Viktor Petruk who made a detailed comparison of two projects in Facebook, where he had shown that while Andrii's project consisted of several strait spans, Stefanie's project had one S-shaped span. Viktor compared the accusations to looking for similarities between the jaguar ornament from Jaguar XK140 and the deer ornament from GAZ-21, where the deer is a Swiss project.

Accidents
As part of the 10 October 2022 missile strikes on Ukraine, a Russian missile hit the bridge, but the bridge survived with minor damage. On 11 October 2022, Vitali Klitschko, the mayor of Kyiv, said that repairs are already underway. On 17 December 2022, the bridge reopened with all 18 floor glass units as well as 143 side glasses replaced.

References

External links 
 Surveillance video of bridge being struck by missile

Glass-bottomed bridges
Bridges in Kyiv